The Federation for Self-financing Tertiary Education (FSTE) is a higher education institutions alliance in Hong Kong. The alliance was established as The Federation for Continuing Education in Tertiary Institutions (FCE) in 1994. The FSTE aims to advance the quality, promote collaboration and share practices in the self-financing tertiary education sector in Hong Kong.

Members 
The FSTE comprises 14 publicly funded higher education institutions and major non-profit-making institutions providing tertiary or continuing education in Hong Kong.
 Caritas Hong Kong
 City University of Hong Kong
 Hong Kong Baptist University
 Hong Kong College of Technology
 Hong Kong Institute of Technology
 Lingnan University
 The Chinese University of Hong Kong
 The Education University of Hong Kong
 The Hong Kong Polytechnic University
 The Hong Kong University of Science and Technology
 The Open University of Hong Kong
 The University of Hong Kong
 Vocational Training Council
 Yew Chung College of Early Childhood Education

Committees 
The FSTE has five committees.
Executive Committee
Membership and Membership Development Committee
Research and Development Committee
Recruitment and Student Affairs Committee
Diploma Yi Jin Programme Management Committee

See also 
 Education in Hong Kong
 Higher education in Hong Kong

References

External links 
  Federation for Self-financing Tertiary Education

Education in Hong Kong